The Golden Bell Award for Best Cinematography for a Drama Series is one of the categories of the competition for Taiwanese television production, Golden Bell Awards. It has been awarded since 1980.

Winners

2020s

References

Cinematography for a Drama Series, Best
Golden Bell Awards, Best Cinematography for a Drama Series